Commissioned cruisers of the Royal New Zealand Navy from its formation on 1 October 1941 to the present:

Loss of HMS Neptune
 was a  light cruiser which served with the Royal Navy during World War II. Early in 1941 the New Zealand Government responded to an Admiralty request for sailors to man an additional cruiser. Neptune was selected and was expected to leave the United Kingdom for New Zealand in May. However, because of the loss of cruisers during the Crete campaign Neptune was instead attached to Admiral Cunningham's Force K, based on Malta. On 19 December 1941 she was sunk by mines. Only one crewman survived.

150 of those lost were New Zealanders, 80 of them had served in the Naval Reserve before the outbreak of war. The loss of Neptune was the greatest single tragedy New Zealand Naval Forces have experienced.

See also
 Current Royal New Zealand Navy ships
 List of ships of the Royal New Zealand Navy

Notes

References
 Walters, Sydney David (1956) The Royal New Zealand Navy: Official History of World War II, Department of Internal Affairs, Wellington Online
 McDougall, R J  (1989) New Zealand Naval Vessels. Page 23–36. Government Printing Office. 
 Royal New Zealand Navy HMS Neptune

 
Military history of New Zealand
Royal New Zealand Navy